"I'm a Rebel" is a hard rock song written by Scottish musician Alex Young (also known as George Alexander), that has been recorded and released by Accept and U.D.O.

A version of the song recorded by Australian hard rock band AC/DC has never been released. Alex Young was the older brother of AC/DC guitarists Angus Young and Malcolm Young.

AC/DC version

"I'm a Rebel" was recorded by AC/DC at Maschen, Germany, in 1976. After an AC/DC show in Machen, promoter Rudy Holzhauer asked the band to record Alex Young's song within Maschen.

AC/DC recorded the song in a few hours with Alex Young on lead vocals, while usual singer Bon Scott (who was reportedly very drunk at the time) did backing vocals. It was recorded without the bands' usual producers, George Young (also a younger brother of Alex Young) and Harry Vanda.

The recording was not included on the band's next album, Dirty Deeds Done Dirt Cheap, nor the box sets Bonfire and Backtracks (which did include many other rarities). It is reportedly held in the vaults of the band's main record label, Albert Productions.

Accept guitarist Wolf Hoffmann has claimed in an interview that the AC/DC recording is "way better" than Accept's version.

Leak claims
In spite of being one of AC/DC's rarest tracks, some uploaded their own recreation of the original version. Some of these uploads can be found through forums and YouTube. However a very few claim to have "leaked the original," where Bon Scott is heard singing the chorus in the background (and supposedly playing drums); hence with the quality of the "leaked" version sounding somewhat "watery".

Personnel
 Bon Scott – background vocals, drums
 Angus Young – lead guitar
 Malcolm Young – rhythm guitar
 Mark Evans – bass
 Phil Rudd – drums
 Alex Young – lead vocals, bass

Accept version

Accept recorded the song in 1979, releasing it in 1980 as a single as well as the opening track for their second album, I'm a Rebel. It was credited to the pseudonym "George Alexander". It was the band's only recording of a song no band member wrote or co-wrote until a rearrangement of Edward Elgar's instrumental "Pomp and Circumstance" was included on Death Row (1994).

Personnel
 Udo Dirkschneider – vocals
 Wolf Hoffmann – guitars
 Jörg Fischer – guitars
 Peter Baltes – bass guitar
 Stefan Kaufmann – drums

U.D.O. version
U.D.O., featuring Accept singer Dirkschneider, released a new recording of the song in 1998 on their album No Limits. They went on to include the song on their 2001 live album release Live from Russia.

Personnel, studio recording
 Udo Dirkschneider – vocals
 Stefan Kaufmann – guitar
 Jürgen Graf – guitar
 Fitty Wienhold – bass guitar
 Stefan Schwarzmann – drums

Personnel, live recording
 Udo Dirkschneider – vocals
 Stefan Kaufmann – guitar
 Igor Gianola – guitar
 Fitty Wienhold – bass guitar
 Lorenzo Milani – drums

Notes

References

Citations

Sources

External links
  – crabsodyinblue.com
  – No Nonsense AC/DC Webzine

Accept (band) songs
AC/DC songs
1976 songs
1980 singles